The Coleman's station was a former New York Central Railroad station that served the residents of North East, New York.

History
When the New York and Harlem Railroad began building their line through the Taconic Mountains towards Chatham in 1851, Coleman's was recommended as a freight only station by local entrepreneur Amasa Coleman, and landowner Oliver Barrett in order to take up a service overflow from Sharon and Millerton Stations. The station which was established in 1852 operated primarily as a freight stop throughout the 19th and early 20th centuries, but began accepting passengers by the late 1950s. As with the rest of the Harlem Line it became a Penn Central station when NYC merged with their longtime rival Pennsylvania Railroad in 1968. Penn Central ended all passenger service north of Dover Plains on March 20, 1972 and the station resumed its freight only status until March 27, 1980 when Conrail abandoned service on that segment of the line. 

Today it is located along the Harlem Valley Rail Trail in the middle of the Coleman Station Historic District.

References

Former New York Central Railroad stations
North East, New York
Railway stations in Dutchess County, New York
Former railway stations in New York (state)
Railway stations in the United States opened in 1852
Railway stations closed in 1972
Historic district contributing properties in New York (state)
1852 establishments in New York (state)
National Register of Historic Places in Dutchess County, New York
Railway stations on the National Register of Historic Places in New York (state)
Transportation in Dutchess County, New York